Neapolis was a town of Colchis, in the Caucasus, located south of Dioscurias, and north of Phasis, on the river Chobos or Chorsos.

References

Populated places in Colchis
Former populated places in the Caucasus
Lost ancient cities and towns